A field force in British and Indian Army military parlance is a combined arms land force operating under actual or assumed combat circumstances, usually for the length of a specific military campaign. It is used by other nations, but can have a different meaning.

United Kingdom use

A field force would be created from the various units in an area of military operations and be named for the geographical area. Examples are:

 Kurram Field Force, 1878
 Peshawar Valley Field Force, 1878
 Kabul Field Force, 1879–1880
 Kabul-Kandahar Field Force, 1880
 Natal Field Force, 1881
 Zhob Field Force, 1890
 Mashonaland Field Force, 1896
 Malakand Field Force, 1896
 Tirah Field Force, 1897
 Yukon Field Force, 1898
 Royal West African Frontier Force, 1900

Australian use

In Australia, a field force comprises the units required to meet operational commitments.

Canadian use

The Canadian Expeditionary Force was considered as a field force created to participate in World War I.

United States use

In the United States, during the Vietnam War the term came to stand for a corps-sized organization with other functions and responsibilities. To avoid confusion with the corps designations used by the Army of the Republic of Vietnam and to allow for a flexible organization, MACV and General William Westmoreland developed the "field force" such as I Field Force and II Field Force. Unlike an Army corps, which had a size and structure fixed by Army doctrine, the field force could expand as needed and had other functions such as liaison with South Vietnamese and civil affairs functions and was flexible enough to have many subordinate units assigned to it.

Police field forces
In counterinsurgency type campaigns, select and specially trained units of police armed and equipped as light infantry have been designated as police field forces who perform paramilitary type patrols and ambushes whilst retaining their police powers in areas that were highly dangerous.

List of Police Field Forces, Paramilitary and Counter-Insurgency Units
 
 Gambia Police Force
 Field Force, 

 Indonesian National Police
 Mobile Brigade Corps
 
 Research and Analysis Wing
 Special Frontier Force
 Special Group (India)
 Central Armed Police Force
 Border Security Force
 Central Industrial Security Force
 Indo-Tibetan Border Police
 Indo-Tibetan Border Police (Water Wing)
 Sashastra Seema Bal
 Central Reserve Police Force
 Bastariya Battalion
 Commando Battalion for Resolute Action
 State Armed Police Forces
 Andhra Pradesh Police
 Greyhounds)
 Jammu and Kashmir Police
 Special Operations Group
 Odisha Police
 Special Operation Group
 West Bengal Police
 Counter Insurgency Force
 
 Kenya Police
 General Service Unit (Mau Mau Uprising)
 
 Royal Lao Police 1955 - 1975
 Directorate of National Coordination 1960 - 1965
 
 Royal Malaysian Police
 General Operations Force, Royal Malaysian Police (Malayan Emergency)
 Senoi Praaq
 
 Mauritius Police Force
 Special Mobile Force
 
 Myanmar Police Force
 Border Guard Police
 
 Namibian Police Force
 Special Field Force
 
 Nigerian Police Force
 Nigerian Mobile Police
  
 Philippine National Police
 Special Action Force
 
 British South African Police 1889 - 1980
 Police Anti-Terrorist Unit 1966 - 1980
 Police Support Unit, (Rhodesian Bush War)
 INTAF 1962 - 1979
 
 Royal Solomon Islands Police Force
 Police Field Force
  
 Republic of Vietnam National Police 1955 - 1975
 Republic of Vietnam National Police Field Force 1966 - 1975 (Vietnam War)
 
 South West African Police 1920 - 1990
 Koevoet 1979 - 1989
 
 Sri Lanka Police
 Special Task Force (Sri Lankan Civil War)
 
 Syrian Special Mission Forces
 
 Police Field Force (Zanzibar Revolution)
 
 Royal Thai Police
 Border Patrol Police
 Thahan Phran
 Village Scouts
 
 Gendarmerie General Command
 Village guard system
 
 Vanuatu Police Force
 Vanuatu Mobile Force, 
 
 Zimbabwe Republic Police
 Police Support Unit

See also
 List of gendarmeries
 List of police tactical units

References

Ad hoc units and formations
Law enforcement units
Law enforcement occupations
Non-military counterterrorist organizations